The South Dakota League was a Class D level minor league baseball league that played from 1920 to 1923. The South Dakota League changed its name to the shortened Dakota League for the 1921 and 1922 seasons. The South Dakota League consisted of teams based in South Dakota. Franchises from Minnesota and North Dakota were added during the two Dakota League seasons. For the 1923 season, the league was divided into two four–team Class D partner entities, the South Dakota League and the North Dakota League.

History
In 1920, the South Dakota League began play as an eight–team Class D level league, with all franchises based in South Dakota. The league would play four seasons and provided the first professional baseball in South Dakota since Sioux Falls played in the 1902–1903 Iowa-South Dakota League. The 1920 South Dakota League charter franchises were the Aberdeen Boosters, Huron Packers, Madison Greys, Miller Climbers, Mitchell Kernels, Redfield Reds, Sioux Falls Soos and Wessington Springs Saints.

The league president for the duration of the South Dakota League/Dakota League was Michael E. Cantillon. Cantillon had been president of the minor league Minneapolis Millers from 1907 to 1918 and was the brainchild behind the formation of the South Dakota League.

In the first season for the South Dakota League, the Mitchell Kernels won the 1920 South Dakota League Championship, their first of three consecutive championships. Mitchell had a 61–36 record under Manager Hank Scharnweber, finishing 3.5 games ahead of the Sioux Falls Soos in the regular season standings to claim the title, as the league had no playoffs for its duration. Baseball Hall of Fame member Jim Bottomley, at age 20, played for the 1920 Mitchell Kernels. Bottomley hit .312 with 7 home runs in 97 games.

In 1921, the league changed names to the Dakota League, reforming after adding the Wahpeton–Breckenridge Twins, based in North Dakota and Minnesota. Baseball play on Sunday had been illegal in North Dakota until the law was repealed in 1920, a positive for early professional teams, who needed the revenue from large Sunday crowds to remain financially viable. Wahpeton, North Dakota newspaper publisher Robert J. Hughes formed the new Wahpeton-Breckenridge, Minnesota franchise, hiring Roy Patterson as manager. The Dakota league remained an eight–team Class D level league, with 13–player rosters. The 1921 league members were the Aberdeen Grays, Huron Packers, Madison Greys, Mitchell Kernels, Redfield Red Sox, Sioux Falls Soos, Wahpeton–Breckenridge Twins and Watertown Cubs. The Mitchell Kernels won their second consecutive league championship, again finishing ahead of the 2nd place Sioux Fall Soos.

Continuing play as an eight–team Class D level league, the 1922 Dakota League season saw the Mitchell Kernels claim the championship, their third consecutive title. The Fargo Athletics, Jamestown Jimkotans and Valley City Hi-Liners became new league franchises in 1922, joining the Aberdeen Grays, Mitchell Kernels, Sioux Falls Soos, Wahpeton-Breckenridge Twins and Watertown Cubs. H.E. Ross founded the Jamestown Jinkotas, with former St. Louis Browns player Wib Smith serving as the Jamestown manager. J.H. Sampson served as president the Valley City Hi-Liners, with Charlie Boardman beginning the season as manager.  Fargo attorney William H. Barnett was the founder of the Fargo Athletics and hired former major league player Ed Whiting to manage Fargo. On August 25, 1922, Roy Birkenstock of Jamestown threw a no-hitter in a 2–0 win over the Sioux Falls Soos. This was the league's first no–hitter. Mitchell finished the 1922 season with a 60–37 record under Manager Hank Scharnweber, 4.5 games ahead of the tied 2nd place teams, the Aberdeen Greys and Fargo Athletics. Baseball Hall of Fame member Al Simmons played for the 1922 Aberdeen Greys. At age 20, Simmons led the Dakota League with 144 hits, while batting .365 with 10 home runs.

In their final season of 1923, the Dakota League split into two four–team partner entities to condense travel, with the leagues called the North Dakota League and South Dakota League.

The 1923 South Dakota League began play as a four–team Class D level league with the Aberdeen Grays, Mitchell Kernels, Sioux Falls Soos and Watertown Cubs as member franchises. The North Dakota League formed the counterpart four–team Class D league, comprising the returning Jamestown Jimkotas, and three new franchises, the Minot Magicians, New Rockford-Carrington Twins/Valley City Hi-Liners and Bismarck Capitals. The 1923 North Dakota League president was Logan Powell. On May 26, 1923, George Dennison of the Minot Magicians threw a no–hitter against the Bismarck Capitals in a 2–1 victory. The South Dakota League folded on July 17, 1923, with the Sioux Falls Soos in 1st place with a 35–22 record, 0.5 games ahead of the Aberdeen Greys. The Minot Magicians led the North Dakota League standings with a 48–21 record at the conclusion of the North Dakota League season, 15.0 games ahead of the 2nd place Jamestown Jimkotas. Both leagues permanently folded after the 1923 season.

Cities represented

Standings & statistics

1920 South Dakota League

1921 Dakota League

1922 Dakota League

Valley City (25–46) moved to Bismarck August 3.

1923 South Dakota League / North Dakota League

 New Rockford–Carrington moved to Valley City July 17.

Notable alumni
Jim Bottomley, (1920) Mitchell Kernels. Inducted, Baseball Hall of Fame (1974).
Al Simmons, (1922) Aberdeen Greys. Inducted, Baseball Hall of Fame (1953)

External links
 Dakota League - Baseball ReferenceSouth Dakota League - Baseball ReferenceNorth Dakota League- Baseball Reference

References

Defunct minor baseball leagues in the United States
Baseball in South Dakota
Baseball leagues in South Dakota
1920 establishments in the United States
1923 disestablishments in the United States
Sports leagues established in 1920
Sports leagues disestablished in 1923